Boneh or Beneh may refer to:

Dan Boneh (b. 1969), Israeli computer scientist
Boneh–Franklin scheme, an identity-based encryption system
Boneh-Lynn-Shacham, a signature authentication system
Solel Boneh, Israeli construction and civil engineering company

Iran
(Persian: بنه)
Beneh, Ardabil, a village in Iran
Boneh, Khuzestan, a village in Iran
Boneh, Markazi, a village in Iran
Boneh Alvan, a village in Iran
Boneh Anbar, a village in Iran
Boneh Balut, Kohgiluyeh and Boyer-Ahmad, a village in Iran
Boneh Dan, a village in Iran
Boneh Darvazeh, a village in Iran
Boneh Dasht, a village in Iran
Boneh Dastak, a village in Iran
Boneh Deraz, a village in Iran
Boneh Goli, a village in Iran
Boneh Guni, a village in Iran
Boneh Ju, a village in Iran
Boneh Kaghi, a village in Iran
Boneh Karuk, a village in Iran
Boneh Kenar, a village in Iran
Boneh Kuh, a village in Iran
Boneh Kuh, Semnan, a village in Iran
Boneh Lam, a village in Iran
Boneh Lasheh, a village in Iran
Boneh Pir, a village in Iran
Boneh Posht, a village in Iran
Boneh Razi, a village in Iran
Boneh Seyyed Taher, a village in Iran
Boneh Shanbeh, a village in Iran
Boneh Sur, a village in Iran
Boneh Var-e Yaqub, a village in Iran
Boneh Zard, a village in Iran
Boneh-e Askari, a village in Iran
Boneh-ye Abbas (disambiguation), villages in Iran
Boneh-ye Abd, a village in Iran
Boneh-ye Abed, a village in Iran
Boneh-ye Abedun, a village in Iran
Boneh-ye Ahmad, a village in Iran
Boneh-ye Ahmadi, a village in Iran
Boneh-ye Ajam, a village in Iran
Boneh-ye Akhund (disambiguation), villages in Iran
Boneh-ye Ali, a village in Iran
Boneh-ye Ali-Mardan Khan, a village in Iran
Boneh-ye Amir Asgar, a village in Iran
Boneh-ye Aqa-ye Bozorg, a village in Iran
Boneh-ye Arun, a village in Iran
Boneh-ye Asad Davud, a village in Iran
Boneh-ye Atabak, a village in Iran
Boneh-ye Ati, a village in Iran
Boneh-ye Azim, a village in Iran
Boneh-ye Ba Damuiyeh, a village in Iran
Boneh-ye Baba Zahed, a village in Iran
Boneh-ye Bad, a village in Iran
Boneh-ye Bandar, a village in Iran
Boneh-ye Cheragh (disambiguation), villages in Iran
Boneh-ye Chahar, a village in Iran
Boneh-ye Dari, a village in Iran
Bon-e Esfandi, a village in Iran
Boneh-ye Esmail (disambiguation), villages in Iran
Boneh-ye Fakhr (disambiguation), villages in Iran
Boneh-ye Fathali, a village in Iran
Boneh-ye Gach, a village in Iran
Bon-e Gelu, a village in Iran
Boneh-ye Ghalim, a village in Iran
Boneh-ye Gholamali, a village in Iran
Boneh-ye Gholamreza, a village in Iran
Boneh-ye Hajat, a village in Iran
Boneh-ye Hajj Nemat, a village in Iran
Boneh-ye Hajji, a village in Iran
Boneh-ye Hajji, Fars, a village in Iran
Boneh-ye Hajji Ali, a village in Iran
Boneh-ye Haqqi, a village in Iran
Boneh-ye Heydar, a village in Iran
Boneh-ye Hoseyn Kaluli, a village in Iran
Boneh-ye Isa, a village in Iran
Boneh-ye Jaberi, a village in Iran
Boneh-ye Jan Mohammad, a village in Iran
Boneh-ye Kamtuleh, a village in Iran
Boneh-ye Karim, a village in Iran
Boneh-ye Kazem, a village in Iran
Boneh-ye Kazem Hajj Soltan, a village in Iran
Boneh-ye Kazem Jamal, a village in Iran
Boneh-ye Khanjar, a village in Iran
Boneh-ye Khater, a village in Iran
Boneh-ye Khiraleh, a village in Iran
Boneh-ye Khumehzar, a former village in Iran
Boneh-ye Kordi, a village in Iran
Boneh-ye Kuyeh, a village in Iran
Boneh-ye Lar, a village in Iran
Boneh-ye Majid, a village in Iran
Boneh-ye Meskin, a village in Iran
Boneh-ye Mirza, a village in Iran
Boneh-ye Mirza Ali Akbar, a village in Iran
Boneh-ye Mohammad, a village in Iran
Boneh-ye Mohammad Ali, a village in Iran
Boneh-ye Molla Ahmad, a village in Iran
Boneh-ye Molla Mehdi, a village in Iran
Boneh-ye Mordeh Ghaffar, a village in Iran
Boneh-ye Morteza, a village in Iran
Boneh-ye Musa, a village in Iran
Boneh-ye Nafal, a village in Iran
Boneh-ye Naimeh, a village in Iran
Boneh-ye Narges, a village in Iran
Boneh-ye Nejat, a village in Iran
Boneh-ye Owlad, a village in Iran
Boneh-ye Qaem, a village in Iran
Boneh-ye Qarz Ali, a village in Iran
Boneh-ye Qeysar, a village in Iran
Boneh-ye Qeytas, a village in Iran
Boneh-ye Qobad, a village in Iran
Boneh-ye Rahimali, a village in Iran
Boneh-ye Rahmani, a village in Iran
Boneh-ye Rashid, a village in Iran
Boneh-ye Rezvan, a village in Iran
Boneh-ye Sahrab, a village in Iran
Boneh-ye Sarhadi, a village in Iran
Boneh-ye Seyyed Mohammad Reza, a village in Iran
Boneh-ye Seyyed Nasrollah, a village in Iran
Boneh-ye Shah Reza Arab, a village in Iran
Boneh-ye Shir Mohammad, a village in Iran
Boneh-ye Sib, a village in Iran
Boneh-ye Sukhteh (disambiguation), villages in Iran
Boneh-ye Sukhteh Char, a village in Iran
Boneh-ye Taher, a village in Iran
Boneh-ye Teymur, a village in Iran
Boneh-ye Yabareh, a village in Iran
Boneh-ye Zobeydeh, a village in Iran
Boneh-ye Zolfaqar, a village in Iran

See also
Boneh Var (disambiguation)
Do Boneh (disambiguation)